Harrison Christian (born 14 December 1990) is a New Zealand journalist and author. His first book, Men Without Country (2021) tells the story of the 1789 mutiny on the Royal Navy vessel HMS Bounty. Christian is a direct descendant of Fletcher Christian, the leader of the Bounty mutiny.

Writing career 
Men Without Country was a bestseller in New Zealand. The book is critical of historians' attempts to portray the Bounty's commander, Lieutenant William Bligh, in a sympathetic light. Christian argues that Bligh's account of the mutiny was inaccurate, and that Bligh and his editors "worked together to turn the story into a work of propaganda through the ommission of key details".

Christian's second book, Should We Fall to Ruin, takes an Anzac perspective of the Japanese invasion of Rabaul, New Guinea, in 1942. It received praise from The Sydney Morning Herald and The Saturday Paper.

Works 
Men Without Country: The true story of exploration and rebellion in the South Seas. Ultimo Press. 2021. ISBN 9781761150258.

Should We Fall to Ruin. Ultimo Press. 2022. ISBN 9781761150067.

References

External links 
 Official website
 Interview on ABC Radio (5 July 2021)
 Interview on Radio New Zealand (17 July 2021)
 Interview at NZ Herald (9 July 2021)
 Interview on ABC Radio (1 March 2022)

New Zealand journalists

New Zealand writers

1990 births

Living people